Jonathan Mason Warren (February 5, 1811August 19, 1867) was a prominent Boston physician, believed to have been the first to administer anesthesia to a child during surgery. He was the son of John Collins Warren.

Warren received a medical degree from Harvard College in 1832. After studying surgery in Europe for three years, hereturned to Boston in 1835 where he worked in general practice. He specialized in reconstructive surgery; he was one of the first surgeons to perform rhinoplasty operations in the United States, and developed ways to close cleft palate through surgery.

Sources

https://collections.countway.harvard.edu/onview/exhibits/show/family-practice/j--mason-warren--1811-1867-
https://collections.countway.harvard.edu/onview/exhibits/show/plastic-surgery-in-boston--the/j--mason-warren
"Jonathan Mason Warren and the Harvard Medical School", Plastic and Reconstructive Surgery, January 1968, (41)1 pp. 84–85

Harvard Medical School alumni
1811 births
1867 deaths
American surgeons